This is a list of truck manufacturers by region.

Europe

Austria
Gräf & Stift (Austria)
ÖAF (Austria)
Steyr (Austria)

Belarus
BelAZ (Belarus)
MAZ (Belarus)
MTZ (Belarus)
MZKT (Belarus)

Belgium
Automiesse (Belgium)
Brossel (Belgium)
Minerva (Belgium)

Bulgaria
Chavdar (Bulgaria)
Madara (Bulgaria)
Preslav (Bulgaria)

Czech Republic
Avia Trucks (Czech Republic)
LIAZ (Czech Republic, 1951–2002)
Praga (Czech Republic)
Škoda (Czech Republic)
Tatra (Czech Republic)

Finland
Sisu Auto (Finland)
Vanaja (Finland)

France
ACMAT (France)
Berliet (France)
Chenard-Walcker (France)
Citroën (France)
De Dion-Bouton (France)
Delahaye (France)
FAR Trucks (France)
Hotchkiss (France)
Labourier (France)
Latil (France)
Loheac (France)
Lorraine-Dietrich (France)
Nicolas (France)
Panhard (France)
Peugeot (France)
Renault Trucks (France)
Saviem (France)
Sides (France)
Simca (France)
Somua (France)
TVS Motar France (France)
Unic (France)
Willème (France)

Germany
Barkas (Germany)
Büssing (Germany)
Borgward (Germany)
Daimler AG (Germany)
ELM Trucking(Germany)
Ford (Germany)
 Grube (Germany)
Hanomag (Germany)
Henschel (Germany)
Horch (Germany)
IFA (Germany)
Kaelble (Germany)
Magirus (Germany)
Mahendra Motor European (Germany)
MAN (Germany)
Mercedes-Benz (Germany)
Multicar (Germany)
Opel (Germany)
Paul Nutzfahrzeuge (Germany)
Robur (Germany)
Tadano Faun GmbH (Germany)
 Titan (Germany)
Unimog (Germany)
Volkswagen Commercial Vehicles (Germany)
Vomag (Germany)

Greece
ELVO (Greece)
Namco (Greece)
 Temax (Greece)

Hungary
Csepel (Hungary)
Raba (Hungary)

Italy
Alfa Romeo (Italy)
Astra (Italy)
Fiat (Italy)
Lancia (Italy)
Officine Meccaniche (Italy)
Officine Meccaniche Tortonesi (Italy)
Iveco (Italy)

The Netherlands
DAF Trucks (Netherlands)
Ginaf (Netherlands)
Kromhout (Netherlands)
FTF Trucks (Netherlands)
Terberg (Netherlands)
 Verheul (Netherlands)

Poland
Jelcz (Poland)
Kalmar (Poland)
Star (Poland)

Romania
ATP Trucks (Romania)
Bucegi (Romania)
DAC Trucks (Romania)
Roman (Romania)

Russia
Avtomobilnoe Moskovskoe Obshchestvo (Russia)
Foton (different models of trucks in Russia)
Gaz (Russia)
Kamaz (Russia)
 Tonar  (Russia)
Ural (Russia)
Yarovit (Russia)
ZiL (Russia)

Serbia
FAP (Serbia)
Neobus (Serbia)
Nibus (Serbia)
Zastava Trucks (Serbia)

Slovenia
TAM (Slovenia)
TVM (Slovenia)

Sweden
Scania (Sweden)
Volvo Trucks (Sweden)

Spain
Barreiros (Spain)
Hispano-Suiza (Spain)
Ebro (Spain)
Pegaso (Spain)
URO (Spain)
TAM (trucks) (Spain)

Switzerland
Berna (Switzerland)
FBW (Switzerland)
Mowag (Switzerland)
Saurer (Switzerland)

Turkey

Ford Trucks (Turkey)
Askam (Turkey)
BMC (Turkey)
Fargo (Turkey)
Genoto (Turkey)
Otokar (Turkey)

United Kingdom
Atkinson (UK)
Austin (UK)
AEC (UK)
Albion (UK)
Argyle (UK)
Armstrong-Saurer (UK)
AWD (UK)
BAE Systems (UK)
Baron (UK)
Bean (UK)
Beardmore (UK)
Bedford (UK)
Belsize Motors (UK)
Bristol UD Trucks/Isuzu Motors/Mitsubishi 
 Fuso Truck And Bus Corporation/Hino Motors Joint Venture 100% (UK)
British Motor Corporation (UK)
Bruce-SN (UK)
Carmichael (UK)
Caledon (UK)
Commer (UK)
Crossley (UK)
Dennis UD Trucks/Isuzu Motors/Mitsubishi Fuso Truck And Bus Corporation/Hino Motors Joint Venture 100% (UK)
Dennis Eagle (UK)
Dennis-Mann Egerton (UK)
Dodge (UK)
Douglas (UK)
Foden (UK)
Ford (UK)
Fowler (UK)
Garner (UK)
Garrett (UK)
Gilford (UK)
GV (UK)
Guy (UK)
Halley (UK)
Hallford (UK)
Hardy (UK)
Haulamatic (UK)
ERF (UK)
HHT (UK)
HSG (UK)
Jensen (UK)
Karrier (UK)
Kerr Stuart (UK)
Lacre (UK)
Leyland (UK)
Leyland DAF (UK)
Lomount (UK)
Manchester (UK)
Mann (UK)
Maudslay (UK)
McCurd (UK)
Morris (UK)
Morris Commercial (UK)
Motor Traction (UK)
Multiwheeler (UK)
 Norde (UK)
Pagefield (UK)
 Proctor (UK)
Quest (UK)
Rotinoff (UK)
Rowe-Hillmaster (UK)
 Rutland (UK)
Scammell (UK)
SD (UK)
Seddon (UK)
Seddon Atkinson (UK)
Sentinel (UK)
Shefflex (UK)
Star (UK)
Straker-Squire (UK)
 Straussler (UK)
Tata Motor UK (UK)
Thames (UK)
Thornycroft (UK)
Tilling Stevens (UK)
TVW (UK)
Union (UK)
Unipower (UK)
USG-Pitt (UK)
Vulcan (UK)
 Yorkshire (UK)
Zwicky (UK)

Ukraine
KrAZ (Ukraine)
LAZ (Ukraine)

Other Countries
Berliet-Tramagal (Portugal)
Bravia SARL (Portugal)
Dennison (Ireland)
Ganja Auto Plant (Azerbaijan)
KAZ (Georgia)
Mitsubishi Motors SA (Portugal)

Asia

China

Beiben (China)
Foton (China)
BYD Company (China)
Chengli Special Automobile (China)
Chery (China)
Sinotruk (China)
Chingkangshan (China)
Ziyang Nanjun (China)
CHTC (China)
CNHTC (China)
Dongfeng Liuzhou Motor (China)
Dongfeng Motor Corporation (China) – Nissan Diesel/Cummins joint venture
FAW (China)
Hohan (China)
Hualing Xingma Automobile (China)
Jianghuai Automobile (China)
Jiangling Motors (China)
Jiaotong (China)
Jiefang (China)
Lovol Heavy Industry (China)
Qingling (China)
Sany (China)
Shaanxi Automobile Group (China)
Shacman (China)
Sitrak (China)
Sitom (China)
Tangjun Ou Ling (China)
XCMG (China)
YTO (China)
Yuejin (China)

India

Ashok Leyland (India)
Asia MotorWorks (AMW) (India)
Daimler India (BharatBenz) (India)
Eicher Motors (India)
Force Motors (India)
GA (Azerbaijan) - 45% subsidiary of Tata Motors
Hindustan Motors (India)
Mahindra Truck and Bus Division (India)
MAN Truck & Bus (left in 2018)
Premier Automobiles (India)
Scania (India)
SML Isuzu Limited (SMLI) (India)
Tata Motors (India)
TVS (India)
Vehicle Factory Jabalpur (India)
Volvo (India)

Japan

Daihatsu (Japan) – 51% owned by Toyota
Hino Motors (Japan) - subsidiary of Toyota
Isuzu (Japan)
Komatsu (Japan)
Mitsubishi Fuso (Japan)
Nissian/Minsei (Japan)
Tata Motors Japan (Japan) - subsidiary of Tata Motors
UD Trucks (Japan)

Iran

Dand (Iran)
Amico (Iran)
Arna (Iran)
Arya (Iran)
HEPCO (Iran)
Persika (Iran)
Kaveh (Iran)

South Korea

Daewoo (South Korea)
Hyundai (South Korea)
Tata Daewoo (South Korea) – subsidiary of Tata Motors

Indonesia

Matra Fire (Indonesia)
Texmaco (Indonesia)

Pakistan

Ghandhara Industries (Pakistan)
Hinopak Motors (Pakistan)
Master Motors (Pakistan)

Other

AIL (Israel)
HICOM (Malaysia)
GA (Azerbaijan)
KAZ (Georgia)
KMC (Cyprus)
Vinaxuki (Vietnam)

North America

American Coleman
American LaFrance (defunct in 2014)
Autocar Company (United States)
Available
Bailey
Bering Trucks
Brockway
Brown
Canadian Car Corporation (Canada)
Crane Carrier Corporation (United States)
Chevrolet
Cline
Colet
Corbitt
Dart (United States)
DeSoto
Diamond T
Dina (Mexico)
Dodge (United States)
E-One (United States)
Fageol (United States)
Flextruc (Canada)
Ford
Freeman
Federal
Freightliner Trucks
FWD Auto Company
Gersix (United States; became Kenworth in 1923))
GMC
General Motors Canada
Gotfredson
Greenkraft Inc
General Vehicle (United States)
Hayes Truck
Hendrickson
Hino (different models for U.S. market)
HME
Hug (United States)
Ibex
Isuzu (different models for U.S. market)
Jarrett (United States)
Jeffedry Quad (United States)
Kenworth (United States)
Knox (United States)
Liberty (United States)
Mack Trucks 
Marmon
Marmon-Herrington
Mitsubishi Fuso
Moreland (United States) 
Nikola (United States)
Navistar International (United States)
Nissan (different models for U.S. market)
Orange EV (United States)
Oshkosh
Kalmar Industries (formerly Ottawa) (yard switch trucks)
Paccar (United States)
Paymaster 
Peterbilt
Pierce
Ramirez (Mexico)
Rapid (United States)
Relay (United States)
Reo (United States)
Republic (United States)
Riker (United States) 
Spangler (United States)
Spartan (United States)
Sterling Trucks (United States)
Stewart & Stevenson (United States)
Studebaker (United States)
Scot (Canada) 
Tesla Motors
Traffic (United States)
UD Trucks (different models for U.S. market)
Volvo Trucks (different models for U.S. market)
Walter (United States)
White
Western Star Trucks
Zeligson (United States)

South America

Agrale (Brazil)
Volkswagen Caminhões e Ônibus (Brazil)

Africa

AVM (Zimbabwe)
Isuzu South Africa (South Africa)
Mahindra Motors African (Mauritius)
Tata Motors Africa (Kenya)
Ralph (truck manufacturer)
SAMIL (South Africa)
SNVI  (Algeria) 
UD Trucks  (Southern Africa) 
Uri (Namibia and South Africa) 
Volvo Trucks  (South Africa)

Oceania

Caterpillar Trucks
Navistar International
DAF Trucks
Freightliner Trucks
Hino
Isuzu
Iveco
Kenworth
Mack Trucks
Mercedes-Benz
Mitsubishi Fuso
RFW
Scania
UD Trucks
Volvo Trucks
Western Star Trucks

See also

List of electric truck makers
List of trucks
List of pickup trucks

References

 
Manufacturers
Truck